The 1981–82 Divizia A was the sixty-fourth season of Divizia A, the top-level football league of Romania.

Teams

League table

Results

Top goalscorers

Champion squad

See also 

 1981–82 Divizia B
 1981–82 Divizia C
 1981–82 County Championship
 1981–82 Cupa României

References

Liga I seasons
Romania
1981–82 in Romanian football